A J-1 visa is a non-immigrant visa issued by the United States to research scholars, professors and exchange visitors participating in programs that promote cultural exchange, especially to obtain medical or business training within the U.S. All applicants must meet eligibility criteria, English language requirements, and be sponsored either by a university, private sector or government program. 353,300 J-1 visas were issued in 2019.

Duration of status
J-1 visitors may remain in the United States until the end of their exchange program, as specified on form DS-2019.  Once a J-1 visitor's program ends, he or she may remain in the United States for an additional 30 days, often referred to as a "grace period", in order to prepare for departure from the country.
 The actual J-1 visa certificate does not specifically document this 30-day post-study/exam "grace period", and consequently some airline counter staff have refused to issue a boarding pass to an embarking student.  In particular, when the student's return ticket is departing after the J-1 visa has expired.  For example: the return date is the next day after the student's last exam.
 If the visitor leaves the United States during these 30 days, the visitor may not re-enter with the J-1 visa.

The minimal and the maximal duration of stay are determined by the specific J-1 category under which an exchange visitor is admitted into the United States.

As with other non-immigrant visas, a J-1 visa holder and his or her dependents are required to leave the United States at the end of the duration of stay.

Mandatory home residence requirement
Many persons in the United States on J-1 visa are subject to the two-year home residency requirement found in Section 212(e) of the Immigration and Nationality Act. Under the Section 212(e), before a person on a J-1 visa with the two-year home residency requirement can obtain H, K, or L visas, obtain U.S. permanent resident status, or change nonimmigrant status inside the US, the J-1 person must either return to the country of last residence for two years or obtain a waiver of the two-year home residency requirement.

Upon their departure from the United States, many J-1 visa holders are required to complete a mandatory two-year home-country physical presence prior to re-entry into the United States under dual intent visas, such as H-1B. This applies for those whose exchange program was funded by either their government or the U.S. government, involves specialized knowledge or skills deemed necessary by their home country or if they  received graduate medical training. The two-year stay can be served in several intervals. This mandatory two-year home-country stay can be waived under the following conditions:
 No objection statement (NOS) issued by the government of the home country of the J visa holders.
 Exceptional hardship: If a J-1 holder can demonstrate that his or her departure would cause exceptional hardship to his U.S. citizen or legal permanent resident dependents.
 Persecution: If a J-1 holder can demonstrate that he or she can be persecuted in his home country.
 Interested government agency: A waiver issued for a J-1 holder by a U.S. Federal Government agency that has determined that such person is working on a project for or of its interest and the person's departure will be detrimental to its interest.
 Conrad program: A waiver issued for a foreign medical graduate who has an offer of full-time employment at a health care facility in a designated health care professional shortage area or at a health care facility which serves patients from such a designated area.

For the No Objection Statement J-1 waiver, the exchange visitor's home country government should issue a No Objection Statement (NOS) through its embassy in Washington, DC directly to the Waiver Review Division that it has no objection to the exchange visitor not returning to the home country to satisfy the INA 212(e) two-year foreign residence requirement, and does not object to the possibility of the exchange visitor becoming a resident of the United States.

Reporting requirements

J-1 visa sponsors are required to monitor the progress and welfare of their participants. The J-1 visa sponsors should ensure that the participants' activities are consistent with the program category identified on the participants' Form DS-2019. Sponsors are also to require their participants to provide current contact (address and telephone number) information and to maintain this information in their files.

All exchange visitor applicants must have a SEVIS-generated DS-2019 issued by a DOS designated sponsor, which they submit when they are applying for their exchange visitor visa. The consular officer verifies the DS-2019 record electronically through the SEVIS system in order to process your exchange visitor visa application to conclusion. Unless otherwise exempt, exchange visitor applicants must pay a SEVIS I-901 Fee to DHS for each individual program.

Electronic records on J-1 visitors and their dependents are maintained in Student and Exchange Visitor Information System (SEVIS) of  the Student and Exchange Visitor Program by their program sponsor.  J-1 visitors must report certain information, such as a change in legal name or a change of address, within 10 days.  Failure  is considered a violation of the J-1 visitor's immigration status and may result in the termination of the visitor's exchange program.

J-1 categories
Different categories exist within the J-1 program, each defining the purpose or type of exchange.  While most J-1 categories are explicitly named in the federal regulations governing the J-1 program, others have been inferred from the regulatory language.

Private sector programs:

 Student, Secondary School
 Au pair and EduCare
 Camp Counselor (summer camp)
 Intern
 Work/Travel
 Teacher
 Trainee
Flight Training (J-1 privileges terminated effective June 1, 2010)
 Alien Physician

Government and academic programs:

 Student, College/University
 Government Visitor
 International Visitor
 Professor and Research Scholar
 Short-Term Scholar
 Specialist

Taxation
Taxation of income earned by J-1 visitors varies according to the specific category the visitor was admitted under; the visitor's country of origin; and the duration of the visitor's stay in the United States.  J-1 visa holders are exempt from paying Federal Insurance Contributions Act (FICA) taxes (for Social Security and Medicare) when they are nonresident aliens for tax purposes, which is usually the first five calendar years if they are categorized as students, or the first two calendar years if they are categorized as teachers or trainees. However, they are subjected to other applicable federal, state, and local taxes. People on J-1 filing their federal income taxes who have been in the United States for five years or fewer (for students) or two years or fewer (for teachers and trainees) need to use the non-resident 1040-NR tax forms.  Some J-1 visa holders may be eligible for certain tax treaty provisions based on their country of origin.

Employers who hire J-1 visitors may also save on payroll taxes. When J-1 visitors do not pay Social Security, Medicare or Federal Unemployment taxes, employers do not have to match these taxes. A typical employer who hires 5 Work/Travel J-1 visitors and  pays $8/hour each may save over $2317 in a typical 4-months season.

History
The United States introduced the J-1 Exchange Visitor Visa Program under the Mutual Educational and Cultural Exchange Act (Fulbright–Hays Act of 1961). The J-1 visa was administered by the U.S. Information Agency (USIA) to strengthen relations between the US and other countries. It fell under the purview of the USIA and not the Immigration and Naturalization Service because its main purpose is to disseminate information; its goal is to give people training and experience in the U.S. that they can use to benefit their home countries. These exchanges have assisted the Department of State in furthering the foreign policy objectives of the United States.

The J-1 Program started by bringing scholars into the United States temporarily for a specific educational objective, such as teaching and conducting research. It then extended to several other Exchange Visitor Programs that shared the same objective, like the au pair, Government Visitor, Professor and Research or Short-Term Scholar, Work and Travel USA and the Trainee Programs.

New regulations in 2011
A job offer is required prior to a visa interview as of 2011. 
Students from six particular countries (Bulgaria, Russia, Romania, Ukraine, Moldova, and Belarus) must have a job offer that has been confirmed by a sponsoring organization before the student can apply for a visa. Because of these requirements, employers and J-1 students must get a head start on the hiring and visa application process.  These regulations were initiated due to allegations of sexual exploitation, illegal business practices, improper housing, and the general vulnerability of J-1 visa recipients.

In 2011, according to a report in the New York Daily News, the United States Department of State announced that the same-sex partners of diplomats of foreign governments who move to a posting in the United States would now be allowed to apply for J-1 visas. Same-sex partners of people entering the United States for non-diplomatic reasons were not eligible under the new policy.

Previously, the same-sex partner of a foreign person working or studying in the United States on a nonimmigrant visa was generally eligible to apply for a B-2 visa. In 2013, the United States Supreme Court ruled that the United States could not define marriage as a union between one man and one woman as husband and wife. Since then, legally married same-sex partners have been treated the same as legally married opposite-sex partners for visa and other purposes.

COVID-19 suspension

Only U.S. government-sponsored J-1 visa programs were temporarily suspended in March 2020 for 60 days as a result of the COVID-19 pandemic. The Bureau of Educational and Cultural Affairs said the decision would be reviewed after the initial period with a further 30 day suspension possible.

On June 22, 2020, President Trump issued an executive order suspending new J visas through the end of 2020. On December 31, 2020, this proclamation was extended to 31 March 2021.

Visa interview documents
 The Certificate of Eligibility (Form DS-2019) issued by the sponsor of the program
 Supporting documents which are country specific and the consulate website will have details
 A valid passport, that does not expire within the next six months
 The I-901 SEVIS Fee ($220)
 Form DS-160 completed online – this is the non-immigrant visa application
 Fee receipt confirming payment of the visa application fee of $160
 A recent color 2"×2" photograph, in the specified format

See also
 J-2 visa
 H-1B visa

References

External links
 

United States visas by type